Féy is a commune in the Moselle department in Grand Est in north-eastern France.

It lies to the south of Metz.

History
Historically, the village possessed a church (église Saint-Pierre) built in 1859 which was destroyed in 1944 during the Second World War. It has been replaced with a newer church built in a more modern style.

See also
 Communes of the Moselle department

References

External links
 

Communes of Moselle (department)